Barranca del Orinoco is the capital of the municipality of Sotillo in the state of Monagas in Venezuela.

Culture 
The cuisine typical is the arepa made with maize and river fish.

Notes and references  

Cities in Monagas